Tafer is a surname. Notable people with the surname include:

Akim Tafer (born 1967), also Hakim Tafer, French boxer of Algerian descent
Aziz Tafer (born 1984), French-Algerian football player
Yannis Tafer (born 1991), French football player

See also
Tafers, municipality in the district of Sense in the canton of Fribourg in Switzerland